Árpád Fazekas is the name of:

Árpád Fazekas (footballer, born 1930), Hungarian footballer
Árpád Fazekas (footballer, born 1949), Romanian footballer